Peder Tollefsen Ilsaas (9 May 1777 – 17 February 1847) was a Norwegian farmer and politician.

He was born on the  Ildsaas nordre farm in the parish of Åmot  in Hedmark, Norway. He inherited the family farm from his father. He worked as a farmer and forest-owner. 

He was elected to the Norwegian Parliament in 1815, representing the constituency of Hedemarkens Amt (now Hedmark). 
He served only one term.

References

1777 births
1847 deaths
Members of the Storting
Hedmark politicians
Norwegian farmers
People from Åmot